Siah Gel or Seyah Gol or Siah Gol or Siyah Gol or Seyahgel or Siahgel may refer to:

Siah Gol, Gilan
Siah Gel, Abdanan, Ilam Province
Siah Gel, Eyvan, Ilam Province
Siah Gol, Kermanshah
Siah Gol, alternate name of Siah Kol, Kermanshah Province
Siah Gel, Khuzestan
Siah Gel, Lorestan
Siah Gol-e Bala, West Azerbaijan Province
Siah Gol-e Pain, West Azerbaijan Province
Siah Gel-e Shah Abbas